Make Up is the fourth album by Japanese rock band Flower Travellin' Band, released in 1973. It is a double album, featuring both live and studio recordings.

Production
After returning from Canada, Flower Travellin' Band began a new album. The mix of live and studio recordings was planned from the beginning. Wanting a mix of sounds, they tried acoustic pieces and experimented with material that would be hard to reproduce live. Growing as a band and as individuals, more individual contributions were made.

Tracks 1, 2, 5, 7 and 8 were recorded live at Yokosuka Bunka Kaikan in Yokosuka on September 16, 1972, while track 9 is a live studio recording. The band's founder and producer Yuya Uchida provides guest vocals on "Blue Suede Shoes".

"Slowly But Surely" was covered by thrash metal band Outrage for their 1988 first album, Black Clouds. "Hiroshima" and the title track were covered by Cult of Personality and thrash metal band United respectively, for the 2000 Flower Travellin' Band Tribute album.

Reception

Eduardo Rivadavia of Allmusic referred to Make Up as confused and "inconsistent to say the least", giving it a 3 star rating out of five. Aquarius Records and the Roadburn Festival were mostly positive in a review, writing that the first two sides show the band's more mellow and pop side, "with the gentle epic ‘Look at My Window’, the bluesy, balladic ‘Shadows of Lost Days’, and the sad ‘Broken Strings’ all probably prompting lighter-raising among concert goers." But stated that the title-track, "Slowly But Surely" and "All the Days" provide heavier fare. They then approved of the 24-minute live version of "Hiroshima", describing it as "chock full of the type of slightly sinister, blown-out riffage that today’s stoner rockers try their hardest to recreate." They finished by claiming the semi-acoustic "spaced out ‘After the Concert’ winds things up wordlessly and beautifully."

Track listing

Credits
 Joe Yamanaka – vocals, percussion
 Hideki Ishima – lead guitar, acoustic guitar
 Jun Kozuki – bass, acoustic guitar
 George Wada – drums
 Nobuhiko Shinohara – keyboards
 Yuya Uchida – vocals on "Blue Suede Shoes", producer
 Ikuzo Orita – producer

References

Flower Travellin' Band albums
1973 albums
Atlantic Records albums